Jason Jeffrey Collier (September 8, 1977 – October 15, 2005) was an American professional basketball player in the National Basketball Association (NBA).

High school career 
Collier led Catholic Central High School of his hometown Springfield, Ohio to the 1996 Ohio State Basketball Championship, for which he was named 1996 Ohio Mr. Basketball.

College career 
After transferring from Indiana, Collier completed his college career at Georgia Tech.

Professional career 
Collier was drafted by the Milwaukee Bucks with the 15th overall pick of the 2000 NBA Draft. He was traded on draft day to the Houston Rockets in exchange for their pick, Joel Przybilla. He then played for the Rockets and the Atlanta Hawks, averaging 5.6 points per game over his career.

With the Hawks, Collier dropped a career-high 22 points on March 12, 2004 in a 138–124 win against the Washington Wizards. Out of the 151 career games Collier played, this was one of only three times where he scored 20 or more points. Collier's final NBA game was played on April 20, 2005 in a 86–110 loss to the Philadelphia 76ers (this was also the Hawks' final game of the 2004–2005 season). Although he was Atlanta's starting center for that game, he only played for nine minutes and had two points and one rebound on 1-4 field goal shooting.

Death and legacy 
During the NBA off-season, Collier died suddenly at the age of 28 on October 15, 2005 in Cumming, Georgia. His autopsy indicated that he died because of a "sudden heart rhythm disturbance caused by an abnormally enlarged heart." Georgia's chief medical examiner, Dr. Kris Sperry, said Collier's heart "was above the accepted limits, even for a man of his size", and said the organ was about one and a half times the size it should have been. It was reported that he experienced shortness of breath before losing consciousness. Medical treatment was performed by emergency medical technicians, but Collier died en route to the hospital.

The Hawks wore permanent black shoulder patches on their uniforms to honor Collier. In his honor, the NBA Development League, on which Collier played for a year in the Fayetteville Patriots and was named to the All-NBA Development League Team, unveiled in the following season the Jason Collier Sportsmanship Award.

NBA career statistics

Regular season

|-
| style="text-align:left;"| 
| style="text-align:left;"| Houston
|  23 || 0 || 9.7 || .380 || .000 || .708 || 1.6 || .3 || .1 || .1 || 3.1
|-
| style="text-align:left;"| 
| style="text-align:left;"| Houston
|  25 || 2 || 14.6 || .432 || .000 || .750 || 3.3 || .4 || .2 || .2 || 4.2 
|-
| style="text-align:left;"| 
| style="text-align:left;"| Houston 
| 13 || 3 || 8.0 || .472 || .000 || 1.000 || 2.2 || .1 || .2 || .1 || 2.8
|-
| style="text-align:left;"| 
| style="text-align:left;"| Atlanta
|  20 || 16 || 27.3 || .479 || .250 || .788 || 5.6 || .9 || .6 || .6 || 11.3 
|-
| style="text-align:left;"| 
| style="text-align:left;"| Atlanta
| 70 || 44 || 13.5 || .463 || .429 || .676 || 2.6 || .3 || .2 || .2 || 5.7
|- class"sortbottom"
| style="text-align:center;" colspan="2"|Career
| 151 || 65 || 14.4 || .455 || .350 || .738 || 2.9 || .3 || .2 || .2 || 5.6

See also
List of basketball players who died during their careers

References

External links 
 
 Remembering Jason Collier

1977 births
2005 deaths
American men's basketball players
Atlanta Hawks players
Basketball players from Ohio
Centers (basketball)
Fayetteville Patriots players
Georgia Tech Yellow Jackets men's basketball players
Houston Rockets players
Indiana Hoosiers men's basketball players
McDonald's High School All-Americans
Milwaukee Bucks draft picks
Parade High School All-Americans (boys' basketball)
Power forwards (basketball)
Sportspeople from Springfield, Ohio